Streeter is a surname. Notable people with the surname include:

 Adams Streeter, American Universalist pastor
 Alan Streeter, Australian football player
 Alison Streeter, British cross-Channel swimmer
 Alson Streeter, American politician 
 Bess Streeter Aldrich, American novelist, author of Spring Came on Forever and other "pioneer novels"
 Brandon Streeter, Offensive Coordinator, Clemson University Football Team
 Burnett Hillman Streeter, British Biblical scholar
 Charlie Streeter, Australian football player
 Daniel Willard Streeter, American hunter and author
 Edward Streeter, American novelist, wrote Father of the Bride
 Floyd Benjamin Streeter, American historian
 Gary Streeter, British politician 
 George Streeter, Chicago squatter on a grounded riverboat for over 30 years
 Graham  streeter, American cinematographer and film director
 Jeff Streeter, former NASCAR driver
 Lillian Carpenter Streeter (1854-1935), American social reformer, clubwoman, author
 Penny Streeter OBE, managing director of a UK recruitment agency
 R. E. Streeter, American, a founder of the Pastoral Bible Institute
 Robert E. Streeter, American academic administrator
 Rosine Streeter, trade unionist from New Caledonia
 Ruth Cheney Streeter, first director of the United States Marine Corps Women's Reserve, first woman major in the USMC
 Ryan Streeter, Vice-President of Civic Enterprises 8, LLC
 Sevyn Streeter, American singer–songwriter
 Tanya Streeter, Caymanian free-diver
 Thomas Winthrop Streeter Sr., American book collector
 Tommy Streeter, American football player
 William "Bill" W. Streeter, American historian, bookbinder, and founder of the Streeter family association